Diogo Mineiro Clemente (born 29 September 1995) is a Portuguese professional footballer who plays for Caldas as a defender.

Football career
On 28 July 2018, Clemente made his professional debut with Oliveirense in a 2018–19 Taça da Liga match against Belenenses.

References

External links

1995 births
Living people
Portuguese footballers
Association football defenders
S.C.U. Torreense players
Caldas S.C. players
U.D. Oliveirense players
F.C. Arouca players
C.F. Estrela da Amadora players
Segunda Divisão players
Campeonato de Portugal (league) players
Liga Portugal 2 players
Sportspeople from Leiria District